Midland Airport may refer to:

Airports
 Midland/Huronia Airport (CYEE), in Midland, Ontario, Canada

United States
 Jack Barstow Municipal Airport (KIKW/IKW/3BS), in Midland County. Michigan
 MBS International Airport (KMBS/MBS), the Midland-Bay City-Saginaw International Airport, in Freeland, Michigan
 Midland Airpark (KMDD/MDD), in Midland County, Texas
 Midland International Air and Space Port (KMAF/MAF), in Midland, Texas
 Midland Army Airfield, World War II-era military airfield in Midland, Texas

See also
 Midland Air Museum, in Baginton, Warwickshire, England, UK
 East Midlands Airport (EGNX/EMA), in Leicestershire, England, UK
 Midway Airport (disambiguation)
 Midland (disambiguation)